The 2015 Saudi Crown Prince Cup Final was the 40th final of the Crown Prince Cup. It took place on 13 February 2015 at the King Fahd International Stadium in Riyadh, Saudi Arabia and was contested between Al-Ahli and Al-Hilal. It was Al-Ahli's 12th Crown Prince Cup final and Al-Hilal's 15th final. This was the fourth meeting between these two clubs in the final Al-Hilal won all previous meetings.

Al-Ahli won the match 2–1 and secured their sixth title and first since 2007.

Teams

Venue

On 27 January 2015, the King Fahd International Stadium was announced as the host of the final venue. This was the 14th Crown Prince Cup final hosted in the King Fahd International Stadium following those in 1992, 1994, 1998, 2003, 2004, 2005, 2006, 2008, 2009, 2010, 2012, 2013 and 2014.

The King Fahd International Stadium was built in 1982 and was opened in 1987. The stadium was used as a venue for the 1992, 1995, and the 1997 editions of the FIFA Confederations Cup. Its current capacity is 68,752 and it is used by the Saudi Arabia national football team, Al-Nassr, Al-Shabab, and major domestic matches.

Background
Al-Hilal reached a record 15th final after a 3–0 win against Al-Khaleej. This was Al-Hilal's eighth final in a row. Previously, they won finals in 1964, 1995, 2000, 2003, 2005, 2006, 2008, 2009, 2010, 2011, 2012, and 2013, and lost in 1999 and 2014.

Al-Ahli reached their 12th final, after a 2–1 win against title holders Al-Nassr. They reached their first final since 2010. They finished as runners-up after losing to Al-Hilal in that year's final. Previously, they won finals in 1957, 1970, 1998, 2002, and 2007, and lost in 1958, 1974, 2003, 2004, 2006 and 2010.

This was the fourth meeting between these two sides in the Crown Prince Cup final. Al-Hilal won all three times in 2003, 2006 and 2010. This was the 11th meeting between these two sides in the Crown Prince Cup; Al-Hilal won 5 times, Al-Ahli won 2 times and the two teams drew three times. The two teams played each other once in the season prior to the final. The match ended in a 0–0 draw.

Road to the final 

Key: (H) = Home; (A) = Away

Match

Details

{| width="100%"
|valign="top" width="40%"|

Statistics

See also

 2014–15 Saudi Crown Prince Cup
 2014–15 Saudi Professional League
 2015 King Cup of Champions

References

External links

Sports competitions in Saudi Arabia
February 2015 sports events in Asia
Al-Ahli Saudi FC matches
Al Hilal SFC matches